The following are the members of the Dewan Undangan Negeri or state assemblies, elected in the 1999 state election and by-elections. Also included is the list of the Sarawak state assembly members who were elected in 2001.

Perlis

Kedah

Elected members

Seating arrangement

Kelantan

Terengganu

Penang

Perak

Pahang

Selangor

Negeri Sembilan

Malacca

Johor

Sabah

Sarawak

2001–2006

Notes

References

Andrighetti, V., Sunai, P., Asian Network for Free Elections., & Asian Forum for Human Rights and Development. (2000). Malaysia: Report of the 1999 Election Observation Mission, 25 November-1 December. Bangkok, Thailand: Asian Network for Free Elections. 
Anzagain Sdn. Bhd. (2004). Almanak keputusan pilihan raya umum: Parlimen & Dewan Undangan Negeri, 1959-1999. Shah Alam, Selangor: Anzagain. 
Faisal, S. H. (2012). Domination and Contestation: Muslim Bumiputera Politics in Sarawak. Institute of Southeast Asian Studies.

1999 elections in Malaysia